Mohamed Abdel-El is an Egyptian wrestler. He competed in the 1948 Summer Olympics.

References

External links
 

Year of birth missing
Possibly living people
Wrestlers at the 1948 Summer Olympics
Egyptian male sport wrestlers
Olympic wrestlers of Egypt